Harry Garnet Bedford Miner VC (24 June 1891 – 8 August 1918) was a soldier in the Canadian Expeditionary Force during the First World War and posthumous recipient of the Victoria Cross, the highest and most prestigious award for gallantry "in the face of the enemy" that can be awarded to British and Commonwealth forces. He earned the award for events that occurred during the Battle of Amiens in August 1918. There are two plaques in his memory in his hometown, Cedar Springs, Ontario and his medals are displayed in a local museum.

Early life
Harry Garnet Bedford Miner was born at Cedar Springs in Ontario, on 24 June 1891, the son of John and Orphra Miner. He was educated in Selton and at Highgate School in Oxford Township. After finishing his education, he took up farming. He lived for a time in the United States, first in Ohio and then Detroit.

First World War
In November 1915, after the outbreak of the First World War, he enlisted in the Canadian Army. He volunteered for the Canadian Expeditionary Force and was posted to the 142nd Battalion. Arriving in England at the end of October 1916 as a lance corporal, he was transferred to the 161st Battalion. Then, after a period of training, he was sent to the Western Front and taken onto the strength of the 58th Battalion, part of 9th Brigade, 3rd Canadian Division. In early 1918, he was awarded the Croix de Guerre for his actions as a leader of a wiring party late the previous year. He was also promoted to corporal.

On 8 August 1918, the opening day of the Battle of Amiens, and the beginning of the Hundred Days Offensive, the 9th Brigade was engaged in fighting at Rifle Wood and then near Demuin. It was at the latter location that he performed the actions that led to his recommendation for the Victoria Cross (VC). He was involved in attacks on two machinegun positions and then a bombing post, and was severely wounded in the process. He died later that day of his injuries. The citation for his VC read:

Miner was buried in the Crouy Military Cemetery just outside the village of Crouy-Saint-Pierre, about 15 kilometers northwest of Amiens and about 25 km northwest of the battlefield on which he fell.

The medal
Miner's medals, including the VC and the Croix de Guerre, are on display at Huron County Museum in Goderich, Ontario. There is a plaque to his memory in his hometown of Cedar Springs; it was unveiled on 22 September 1963 by his brother Ross Miner. There is another plaque to him in the United Church at Cedar Springs. Branch 185 of the Royal Canadian Legion in Blenheim, Ontario, is named the Harry Miner Branch. Branch 140 of the Royal Canadian Legion in Clinton, Ontario is also named after him.

Notes

References

Further reading

External links
 Harry Garnet Bedford Miner's digitized service file
 Legion Magazine article

1891 births
1918 deaths
Canadian World War I recipients of the Victoria Cross
People from Chatham-Kent
Recipients of the Croix de Guerre 1914–1918 (France)
Canadian military personnel killed in World War I
Canadian Expeditionary Force soldiers
Canadian Army soldiers
Royal Regiment of Canada
Royal Regiment of Canada soldiers